Luis María Drago ( - ) was an Argentine politician. 

Born into a distinguished Argentine family in Buenos Aires, Drago began his career as a newspaper editor. Later, he served as a minister of foreign affairs (1902). At that time, when the UK, Germany, and Italy were seeking to collect the public debt of Venezuela by force, he wrote to the Argentine minister in Washington setting forth his doctrine, commonly known as the Drago Doctrine.

External links
 
 Columbia Encyclopedia article on Luis María Drago
  Encyclopedia.com article on Luis María Drago

1859 births
1921 deaths
People from Buenos Aires
Argentine journalists
Male journalists
Foreign ministers of Argentina
Burials at La Recoleta Cemetery